111 Centoundici is  Tiziano Ferro's second studio album, released in late 2003.

The album was a tremendous success in Italy, topping the Italian Album Chart and selling over 450,000 copies, surpassing the success of previous album, Rosso Relativo, in the country. The Spanish version of the album, 111 Ciento once, was also released the same year and helped the album sell over one million copies around the world, further cementing Ferro as a well-recognized international pop and R&B artist.

The album sold well due to the popularity of the first single "Xverso", but when single "Sere nere" was released the album increased in sales much faster, thanks to the song reaching #1 in the airplay charts of Italy and Mexico. In   Turkey, Tiziano Ferro's "111: Centoundici" album was released on January 7, 2005.

Track listing

Charts

Weekly charts

Year-end charts

Certifications and sales

Notes

External links 
 Sitio Oficial de Tiziano Ferro

Tiziano Ferro albums
2003 albums
Italian-language albums
EMI Records albums
Albums produced by Michele Canova